Louis Leithold (San Francisco, United States, 16 November 1924 – Los Angeles, 29 April 2005) was an American mathematician and teacher. He is best known for authoring The Calculus, a classic textbook about calculus that changed the teaching methods for calculus in world high schools and universities. Known as "a legend in AP calculus circles," Leithold was the mentor of Jaime Escalante, the Los Angeles high-school teacher whose story is the subject of the 1988 movie Stand and Deliver.

Biography

Leithold attained master's and doctorate degrees from the University of California, Berkeley. He went on to teach at Phoenix College (Arizona) (which has a math scholarship in his name), California State University, Los Angeles, the University of Southern California, Pepperdine University, and The Open University (UK). In 1968, Leithold published The Calculus, a "blockbuster best-seller" which simplified the teaching of calculus.

At age 72, after his retirement from Pepperdine, he began teaching calculus at Malibu High School, in Malibu, California, drilling his students for the Advanced Placement Calculus, and achieving considerable success. He regularly assigned two hours of homework per night, and had two training sessions at his own house that ran Saturdays or Sundays from 9AM to 4PM before the AP test. His teaching methods were praised for their liveliness, and his love for the topic was well known. He also taught workshops for calculus teachers. One of the people he influenced was Jaime Escalante, who taught math to minority students at Garfield High School in East Los Angeles. Escalante's subsequent success as a teacher is portrayed in the 1988 film Stand and Deliver.

Leithold died of natural causes the week before his class (which he had been "relentlessly drilling" for eight months) was to take the AP exam; his students went on to receive top scores. A memorial service was held in Glendale, and a scholarship established in his name.

References

External links

University of California, Berkeley alumni
Writers from San Francisco
Schoolteachers from Arizona
20th-century American mathematicians
21st-century American mathematicians
1924 births
2005 deaths
History of calculus
American science writers
Educators from California
California State University, Los Angeles faculty
University of Southern California faculty
Pepperdine University faculty
20th-century American educators